Abicht is a German surname derived from "Albrecht". Notable people with the surname include:

 Adolf Abicht (1793–1860), Polish-Lithuanian physician
 Albert Abicht (1893–1973), German farmer and politician
 Henryk Abicht (1835–1863), Polish independence activist 
 Johann Georg Abicht (1672–1740), German theologian
 Johann Heinrich Abicht (1762–1816), German philosopher

See also 
 Abich

German-language surnames